Memorial Regional Hospital is a 797-bed public hospital located in Hollywood, Florida. The hospital is the flagship hospital of Memorial Healthcare System.

Services 
Memorial Regional Hospital is home to a Level I trauma center, the Memorial Cardiac & Vascular Institute, the Memorial Cancer Institute, and the Memorial Neuroscience Institute. The hospital also features the Dr. Henry D. Perry Family Birthplace, a labor and delivery unit. Joe DiMaggio Children's Hospital is across the street and connected by skyway for transfers to its Level III neonatal intensive care unit.

References 

Teaching hospitals in Florida
Trauma centers